Emerson Eugene Deckerhoff, Jr. (born May 2, 1945) is the radio play-by-play announcer of the NFL's Tampa Bay Buccaneers, a post he has held since 1989.  He also served as the longtime voice of the Florida State Seminoles, calling games for the football, men's basketball, and baseball teams. Deckerhoff announced his retirement from FSU broadcasts following the football team's 2022 spring game.

He also has broadcast games for the Arena Football League's Orlando Predators and Tampa Bay Storm as a television play-by-play announcer. He also voices the P.A. announcer for EA Sports Madden NFL, NCAA Football and Arena Football video games.

Broadcasting career
Deckerhoff formerly hosted a 30-minute weekly TV show with former FSU head coach Bobby Bowden called "The Bobby Bowden Show" in which they reviewed the previous day's game. The show regularly featured a segment with Burt Reynolds, an FSU alum who played for the Seminole football team in the 1950s.

Gene covered both the Bucs and 'Noles concurrently from 1989 to 2022. He and his wife traveled from Tallahassee to Tampa during football season when Gene's teams were both playing home games.

Deckerhoff is known for bellowing "Touchdown, Tampa Bay!" after every Buccaneer touchdown. During home games, he also adds, "Fire the cannons!"–a nod to the cannons that fire after every touchdown at Raymond James Stadium.

In 2000, he was inducted into the Florida Sports Hall of Fame, and in 2002 was inducted into the Florida State University Athletics Hall of Fame. He graduated from the University of Florida, but was quoted as saying "I'm not a Gator - Period."

References

External links
 GeneDeckerhoff.com
 Radio Interview With Gene Deckerhoff August 2011 - Miller on Sports Radio

Arena football announcers
College basketball announcers in the United States
Baseball announcers
College football announcers
American television sports announcers
American radio sports announcers
Florida State Seminoles football announcers
National Football League announcers
People from Jacksonville, Florida
Tampa Bay Buccaneers announcers
University of Florida alumni
1945 births
Living people
United States Football League announcers